This Side of the Law is a 1950 American film noir directed by Richard L. Bare and starring Kent Smith, Viveca Lindfors, Robert Douglas and Janis Paige.

Plot
David Cummins (Kent Smith) is trapped in a dry cistern and wondering whether he will die there. The largest portion of the rest of the film is a flashback to a week earlier then forward, detailing the events that landed him in that precarious pit.

A bright but down-and-out vagrant is tapped by a police officer for looking longingly in a pawn shop window at a revolver. A smart retort to the officer's question has him carted off to jail for "no visible means of support." The following day he's in court hearing "$50 dollars or 30 days."

Listening to the exchange is cagey lawyer Philip Cagle (Robert Douglas), who pays his fine. After a meal and a taxi ride the pair enter the attorney's office, where he explains why. The counselor is the executor of the estate of a wealthy man, Malcolm Taylor, whom the bum just happens to resemble exactly. The rich man has been missing for seven years minus two weeks and is about to be declared legally dead, which would be inconvenient for the lawyer. (Though it's unclear why).

If David will agree to impersonate the missing man he'll be paid $500. Holding out for $5,000 the pair come to terms then ride to a huge house near a cliff belonging to the missing man. During the journey the lawyer adds some information about the man's task. He must fool three people — the man's wife, his brother and the brother's wife. He adds at the end of the trip, just as they arrive: "By the way, your brother hates you."

David soon finds that it isn't just the brother who is none too fond. His wife Evelyn (Viveca Lindfors) is more than a little estranged, apparently as a result of the husband's many affairs and general callousness before his disappearance. Fortunately, Evelyn doesn't know that husband Malcolm Taylor's most recent affair was with his brother's wife, Nadine Taylor (Janis Paige).

When David reaches the estate, the owner's dog, Angel, bears his teeth. David let's the dog smell the owner's jacket sleeve (it isn't explained how David got this jacket which must be at least seven years old) and the dog backs off. The impersonation comes off well for some time as David insinuates himself into the family until Nadine notices his hands, which lack some tell-tale scars. David tells Philip and the lawyer connives to have her meet him at a lonely spot on the estate, then shoves her off the cliff.

Things move rapidly ahead from this point, past various confusing scenes that ultimately result in Philip tossing David into the cistern. His plan all along was to continue to act as the executor of the estate in order to control the money. (Which, incidentally, makes it somewhat baffling why he wanted to delay the wealthy man being declared legally dead in the first place. Apparently, he needed more time to arrange for Evelyn's death.)

No matter, for David will soon find the will and ability to crawl out of the dry well — but not before discovering the skeletal remains of Malcolm Taylor. He reaches the top just in time to hear the screams of Evelyn, with whom David is now completely besotted. He rushes to rescue her just in time to avoid her suffering the same fate at Philip's hands as Nadine.

All is confessed to the puzzled police and all resolved, with Taylor's wife showing that she now returns David's feelings.

Cast
 Kent Smith as David Cummins
 Viveca Lindfors as Evelyn Taylor
 Robert Douglas as Philip Cagle
 Janis Paige as Nadine Taylor
 John Alvin as Calder Taylor
 Monte Blue as The Sheriff
 Frances Morris as Miss Roberts
 Nita Talbot as Miss Goff

Reception
Film historian and critic Hal Erickson praised the work of Viveca Lindfors, "Top-billed Viveca Lindfors brings a bit of texture to the otherwise two-dimensional character of Cummins' 'wife.'"

References

External links
 
 
 
 
 
 This Side of the Law information site and DVD review at DVD Beaver (includes images)

1950 films
1950 drama films
American drama films
American black-and-white films
Film noir
Warner Bros. films
Films directed by Richard L. Bare
Films scored by William Lava
1950s English-language films
1950s American films